Button Island is a small island in the Hingham Bay area of the Boston Harbor Islands National Recreation Area. It is part of the Town of Hingham. The island has a permanent size of under , plus an intertidal zone of a further . The island is managed by the town of Hingham, and access is by private boat only.

The island is notable for a large oak tree, which together with several smaller oaks, cedars, and sumac cover the island. Shrub species such as bayberry and dewberry can also be found. Grasses and sea-lavender populate the inter-tidal zone.

References

Islands of Plymouth County, Massachusetts
Boston Harbor islands
Hingham, Massachusetts
Coastal islands of Massachusetts